The 1955 Southern Conference men's basketball tournament took place from March 3–5, 1955 at the Richmond Arena in Richmond, Virginia. The West Virginia Mountaineeers, led by head coach Fred Schaus, won their first Southern Conference title and received the automatic berth to the 1955 NCAA tournament.

Format
The top eight finishers of the conference's ten members were eligible for the tournament. Teams were seeded based on conference winning percentage. The tournament used a preset bracket consisting of three rounds.

Bracket

* Overtime game

See also
List of Southern Conference men's basketball champions

References

Tournament
Southern Conference men's basketball tournament
Southern Conference men's basketball tournament
Southern Conference men's basketball tournament